The Obsha is a river in Sychyovsky District of Smolensk Oblast and Oleninsky, Belsky, and Zharkovsky Districts of Tver Oblasts, Russia. It is a left tributary of the Mezha (Western Dvina basin). The town of Bely is located on the banks of the Obsha.

The source of the Obsha is in the northwestern part of Sychyovsky District. The river flows north, turns west and crosses into Tver Oblast. A stretch of it makes the border between Smolensk and Tver Oblasts. It crosses the southern part of Oleninsky District, a short stretch of the Obsha makes a border between Oleninsky and Belsky Districts, and downstream of the village of Antipino it departs from the border and flows southwest, through the town of Bely. In Bely, it turns northwest and crosses into Zharkovsky District. The mouth of the Obsha is located by the village of Ustye.

The drainage basin of the Obsha includes almost the whole area of Belsky District, as well as minor areas in the west of Sychyovsky District, in the south of Oleninsky District, in the northeast of Zharkovsky District, and in the north of Kholm-Zhirkovsky District of Smolensk Oblast.

References

Rivers of Smolensk Oblast
Rivers of Tver Oblast